Lawrence County is a county located in the U.S. state of Indiana.  As of 2010, the population was 46,134.  The county seat is Bedford. Lawrence County comprises the Bedford, IN Micropolitan Statistical Area.

History
Until the Battle of Tippecanoe, the general area of Lawrence County was populated primarily by Native Americans. The first trace of white settlement in Lawrence County was near Leesville; however, Bono was the first white settlement in the county. Lawrence County was formed in 1818 by subdividing Orange County. The English name refers to Captain James Lawrence, who uttered the famous words "Don't give up the ship." after being mortally wounded during the War of 1812. Prior to Lawrence County's creation, it was organized as "Leatherwood Township." On March 11, 1818, the county commissioners Ambrose Carlton, Thomas Beagley, and James Stotts, met at the home of James Gregory. On the third day of this session, the commissioners proceeded to divide the county into two civil townships: Shawswick and Spice Valley. Early in 1819, the board adopted a seal for Lawrence County, which was designed with a harp, a plow, three sheaves of weat, a pair of scales, and a weathercock on top. The first county seat of Lawrence County was located at Palestine, situated on a high bluff near the East Fork of the White River. 276 lots were laid out in Palestine, which were advertised for sale on May 25, 1818. Steps were immediately taken to build a courthouse and a jail. The first courthouse of the county was log and erected in the spring of 1818. This courthouse was temporary, and steps to construct a permanent courthouse began in November 1818. It was first designed in octagonal form, with brick walls, a stone foundation, with 45 windows and to be two stories tall. The courthouse was finished in the autumn of 1821, at a total cost of $5,500 (1821 USD). After much disease, and a tornado that swept through the area in 1820, the county approved the relocation of the county seat on February 9, 1825. The name "Bedford" was selected for the new county seat by Joseph Rawlins, a local businessman, after Bedford County, Virginia. The town was laid out on March 30, 1825, and current residents of Palestine were offered a lot in Bedford. The county records were hauled from Palestine to Bedford by Richard Evans. In early 1825, a temporary log courthouse was erected at Bedford. In 1831, the board of commissioners took up the matter of building a more suitable courthouse and advertised bids for a courthouse similar to the one at Salem in May, and there obtained complete plans of that structure. The old buildings at Palestine were sold, and the proceeds were to be used in the construction of the new building. The building was finished in May 1834. A fourth courthouse was built in 1872. The fifth and current courthouse was built in 1930. Perry Township was created in May 1822, and Indian Creek Township was extended south to the river. Around the same time, Flinn Township was created. On January 23, 1826, Marion Township was created, followed by Marshall Township in June 1855. In March 1866, 180 residents petitioned for a new township, called "Morton", to be formed out of Shawswick, Bono, and Flinn, but after much thought was named Guthrie Township after an old pioneer family of the county. On January 1, 1911, Flinn Township was annexed by Shawswick, Guthrie, and Pleasant Run Townships, after the county commissioners meeting a month prior.

Geography

Adjacent counties
 Monroe County  (north)
 Jackson County  (east)
 Washington County  (southeast)
 Orange County  (south)
 Martin County (west)
 Greene County (northwest)

Major highways
  U.S. Route 50
  State Road 37
  State Road 54
  State Road 58
  State Road 60
  State Road 158
  State Road 446
  State Road 450
  State Road 458

National protected area
 Hoosier National Forest (part)

Municipalities

Cities and Towns

Census-designated places
 Avoca
 Williams

Unincorporated communities

Former communities

Townships

Local sights
 Joe Palooka Statue – a statue of a comic strip character Joe Palooka, dedicated in 1948, is located near the town hall in Oolitic.
 Spring Mill State Park is located near Mitchell

Astronauts
Lawrence County has had several native residents that have become astronauts over the years. They include:
 Virgil I. "Gus" Grissom was born and raised in Mitchell; was killed in the Apollo 1 accident
 Charles "Charlie" Walker was born and raised in Bedford.
 Kenneth "Kenny" Bowersox was born in Virginia but was raised in Bedford

The Virgil I. Gus Grissom Memorial, located at the Spring Mill State Park near Mitchell, has many mementos of his career, including the space capsule he commanded, "The Molly Brown" from Gemini 3.

Climate and weather 

Government

The county government is a constitutional body, and is granted specific powers by the Constitution of Indiana, and by the Indiana Code.

County Council: The county council is the legislative branch of the county government and controls all the spending and revenue collection in the county. Representatives are elected from county districts. The council members serve four-year terms. They are responsible for setting salaries, the annual budget, and special spending. The council also has limited authority to impose local taxes, in the form of an income and property tax that is subject to state level approval, excise taxes, and service taxes.

Board of Commissioners: The executive body of the county is made of a board of commissioners. The commissioners are elected county-wide, in staggered terms, and each serves a four-year term. One of the commissioners, typically the most senior, serves as president. The commissioners are charged with executing the acts legislated by the council, collecting revenue, and managing the day-to-day functions of the county government.

Court: The county maintains a small claims court that can handle some civil cases. The judge on the court is elected to a term of four years and must be a member of the Indiana Bar Association. The judge is assisted by a constable who is also elected to a four-year term. In some cases, court decisions can be appealed to the state level circuit court.

County Officials: The county has several other elected offices, including sheriff, coroner, auditor, treasurer, recorder, surveyor, and circuit court clerk Each of these elected officers serves a term of four years and oversees a different part of county government. Members elected to county government positions are required to declare party affiliations and to be residents of the county.

Lawrence County is part of Indiana's 9th congressional district; Indiana Senate district 44; and Indiana House of Representatives districts 65 and 73.

Demographics

As of the 2010 United States Census, there were 46,134 people, 18,811 households, and 12,906 families residing in the county. The racial makeup of the county was 97.3% white, 0.5% Asian, 0.4% black or African American, 0.3% American Indian, 0.3% from other races, and 1.1% from two or more races. Those of Hispanic or Latino origin made up 1.2% of the population. In terms of ancestry, 18.4% were German, 14.6% were Irish, 13.1% were American, and 10.4% were English.

Of the 18,811 households, 31.2% had children under the age of 18 living with them, 54.1% were married couples living together, 10.1% had a female householder with no husband present, 31.4% were non-families, and 27.3% of all households were made up of individuals. The average household size was 2.42 and the average family size was 2.92. The median age was 41.6 years.

The median income for a household in the county was $47,697 and the median income for a family was $50,355. Males had a median income of $42,337 versus $30,386 for females. The per capita income for the county was $21,352. About 10.9% of families and 15.8% of the population were below the poverty line, including 23.4% of those under age 18 and 10.6% of those age 65 or over.

See also
 National Register of Historic Places listings in Lawrence County, Indiana

References

External links
 Lawrence County Sheriff's Office

 
Indiana counties
1818 establishments in Indiana
Populated places established in 1818